Anthurium sulcatum is a species of plant in the family Araceae. It is endemic to Ecuador, and became known to the scientific community when Luis Sodiro collected a type in the Pchincha province in 1882. A collection of the species was housed in the Berlin herbarium, which was destroyed during the Second World War. Its natural habitat is subtropical or tropical moist lowland forests. It is threatened by habitat loss.

References

Endemic flora of Ecuador
sulcatum
Data deficient plants
Taxonomy articles created by Polbot